The Wenlock (sometimes referred to as the Wenlockian) is the second epoch of the Silurian. It is preceded by the Llandovery Epoch and followed by the Ludlow Epoch.

Naming and history 
The Wenlock is named after Wenlock Edge, an outcrop of rocks near the town of Much Wenlock in Shropshire (West Midlands, United Kingdom). The name was first used in the term "Wenlock and Dudley rocks" by Roderick Murchison in 1834 to refer to the limestones and underlying shales that underlay what he termed the "Ludlow rocks". He later modified this term to simply the "Wenlock rocks" in his book,  The Silurian System in 1839.

Definition and subdivision 
The Wenlock's beginning is defined by the lower boundary (or GSSP) of the Sheinwoodian. The end is defined as the base (or GSSP) of the Gorstian.

The Wenlock is divided into the older Sheinwoodian and the younger Homerian stage.

References 

 
02
Geological epochs